Eslinbridge, also written Eslin Bridge, is a settlement in Mohill parish in County Leitrim at the crossroads of L3444 and L3447. Here, the L3444 road crosses Eslin River on a bridge.

The settlement covers parts of the townlands of Cavan, Drumregan, and Tulcon. The community centre of Eslinbridge is located in the latter townland.

References

Towns and villages in County Leitrim